Walter Schulz (18 November 1912, in Gnadenfeld/Oberschlesien – 12 June 2000, in Tübingen) was a German philosopher.

Schulz studied classical philology, philosophy and protestant theology at the University of Marburg, University of Breslau and University of Leipzig.

After being seriously wounded as a soldier in World War II, Schulz took his doctorate in 1944 with Hans-Georg Gadamer in Leipzig, and habilitated in 1950 in Heidelberg.

Schulz was appointed a professor at the University of Tübingen in 1955. Offered the chair of Martin Heidegger at Freiburg im Breisgau in 1958, he refused. Until his retirement in 1978, he was one of the Tübingen scholars with the largest audience.

Publications (in German) 
 Die Vollendung des Deutschen Idealismus in der Spätphilosophie Schellings (1955)
 Der Gott der neuzeitlichen Metaphysik (1957)
 Wittgenstein. Die Negation der Philosophie (1967) 
 Philosophie in der veränderten Welt (1972)
 Ich und Welt (1979)
 Metaphysik des Schwebens (1985) 
 Grundprobleme der Ethik (1989)
 Subjektivität im nachmetaphysischen Zeitalter (1992)
 Der gebrochene Weltbezug (1994)

Further reading 
 Renate Breuninger: Die Philosophie der Subjektivität im Zeitalter der Wissenschaften. Zum Denken von Walter Schulz. Klett-Cotta, Stuttgart 2004,.
 Renate Breuninger, Werner Raupp: Schulz, Walter. In: Neue Deutsche Biographie (NDB). Band 23, Duncker & Humblot, Berlin 2007,, S. 717 (Digitalisat).
 Renate Breuninger, Werner Raupp: Schulz, Walter. In: Biographisch-Bibliographisches Kirchenlexikon (BBKL). Band 21, Bautz, Nordhausen 2003,, Sp. 1405–1427.
 Renate Breuninger, Werner Raupp: Schulz, Walter. – In: Baden-Württembergische Biographien, Bd. 5, Stuttgart 2013, Sp. 398–400.

German philosophers
People from Kędzierzyn-Koźle County
1912 births
2000 deaths
University of Marburg alumni
University of Breslau alumni
Leipzig University alumni
German military personnel of World War II
Academic staff of the University of Tübingen
Heidegger scholars
People from the Province of Silesia
20th-century German historians